An outdoor bronze bust of Alexander Lyman Holley by artist John Quincy Adams Ward and architect Thomas Hastings is installed in Washington Square Park in Manhattan, New York. Cast by the Henry-Bonnard Bronze Company of New York and dedicated in 1889, the sculpture is set on an Indiana limestone pedestal and displays a Beaux-Arts style design.

See also

 1889 in art

References

External links
 

1889 establishments in New York (state)
1889 sculptures
Bronze sculptures in Manhattan
Busts in New York City
Monuments and memorials in Manhattan
Outdoor sculptures in Manhattan
Sculptures of men in New York City